The Fayetteville Guard was a professional indoor football team in the National Indoor Football League (NIFL) and American Indoor Football Association (AIFA). They played home games at the Cumberland County Crown Coliseum from 2005 to 2010.

The Guard were replaced by the Fayetteville Force in the Southern Indoor Football League (SIFL) for the 2011 season. After a 3–0 start to the 2011 SIFL season, the Force collapsed and was eventually sold to the AIFA. The Force did not return in 2012 and were replaced the Cape Fear Heroes expansion team as part of American Indoor Football.

History

Stingrays
The teams began play in 2003 as the Myrtle Beach Stingrays of the National Indoor Football League in the Myrtle Beach Convention Center, compiling a 6–8 record in their inaugural season. After two games in the 2004 season, the NIFL shut down the team due to the team owners, April Coble and Jack Bowman, failing to pay the players and other obligations. However, local investors including then head coach Terry Smith, saved the team in time to schedule a third game at the Staten Island Xtreme the last weekend of April. On April 29, the team was moved to Florence, South Carolina, for the remainder of the season as the Carolina Stingrays with seven home games at the Florence Civic Center. The relocated team finished with a 3–6 record in Florence and a final 5–7 record in their second season.

Guard
The following year, the team was purchased again and moved to Fayetteville to replace af2's Cape Fear Wildcats, who had moved to Albany, Georgia, as the South Georgia Wildcats. The new team had originally been called the Fayetteville Heat, but later changed their name to the Fayetteville Guard. The team started their season 0–5, but went 7–2 in their final nine regular season games, earning a 7–7 record and a playoff berth. The team defeated the Dayton Warbirds in the first round, but lost to the Cincinnati Marshals in the divisional round.

The Guard did better in 2006, posting a 13–1 record in the regular season, then defeating the Lakeland Thunderbolts and River City Rage en route to Indoor Bowl VI, where they lost to the Billings Outlaws.

In August 2006, it was reported that the Guard were moving to the World Indoor Football League. However, the Guard denied these rumors by announcing that they were staying in the NIFL in a press conference two months later. During the 2007 season, the Guard and Wyoming Cavalry organized with owners of other independently owned NIFL teams to ensure they had a complete season, but without the approval of the rapidly falling apart NIFL management, which led to a midseason schedule split between the league-owned teams and the independent teams. Both the Guard and Cavalry were subsequently expelled from the NIFL before the post season. They played against each other in the Budweiser Indoor Football Championship Bowl, where the Guard won 48–34. Both teams joined the American Indoor Football Association (AIFA) the following 2008 season.

Force

Following the 2010 AIFA season, the league split into two leagues: the AIFA West and East. The AIFA East, of which Fayetteville was a member, then merged into the Southern Indoor Football League (SIFL) for the 2011 season . However, a new Fayetteville-based sports marketing group claimed the rights to field a SIFL team in the Fayetteville market and the Guard did not return for the 2011 season. The new team, not affiliated with the Guard or its owners, were called the Fayetteville Force. After a 3–0 start to the 2011 SIFL season, the team collapsed.

The AIFA entered into an asset purchase agreement of selected assets of the Fayetteville Force from Fanteractive, LLC, the Force's parent company, but the AIFA did not purchase the corporation that was operating the Force. Under the agreement the AIFA retained the Force name, logo, likeness, playing equipment, and the artificial turf. The AIFA guaranteed that it would play the remaining four Force games with the Southern Indoor Football League.

Due to contractual issues between the previous owner and his players and coaches at the time, the AIFA was unable to take over those contracts. On two-day notice before the Erie away game, the AIFA had to assemble a team of available players from a group of former indoor players and rookies. The AIFA selected as head coach Matt Steeple, a veteran indoor coach from the Indoor Football League for the balance of the 2011 season. The new Fayetteville Force never won a game and has the dubious distinction of setting a record for the largest single-game losing margin and points allowed in the history of indoor football – in any league – following a 0–138 loss to the Erie Explosion on May 21, 2011.

The AIFA reorganized as American Indoor Football (AIF) after the SIFL folded following its lone 2011 season. The Force did not return in 2012 and were replaced the Cape Fear Heroes expansion team in the AIF.

Season-by-season

Results

Schedules

2005

2006

2007

2008

2009

2010

2011

References

External links
 Force's 2011 stats

Southern Indoor Football League teams
National Indoor Football League teams
American Indoor Football Association teams
Sports in Fayetteville, North Carolina
American football teams in North Carolina
2005 establishments in North Carolina
2010 disestablishments in North Carolina
American football teams established in 2005
American football teams disestablished in 2010